Big Giant Swords is an American television series that premiered on January 13, 2015 on the Discovery Channel. The program follows sword maker Michael "Irish Mike" Craughwell as he and his associates create custom oversized swords from scratch for his clients. Episodes focus on the creation process of one or two commissioned weapons as the team attempts to complete them to the customer's satisfaction in a set time period.

Background
Craughwell first began making giant swords in 2003 as a hobby and models many of his works after swords found in video games and other fictional media. Craughwell first garnered attention for his creations after posting videos of himself wielding the weapons on YouTube. He is based out of West Tisbury, MA on the island of Martha's Vineyard.

Episodes
 Episode 1: Zeus Almighty
 Episode 2: The Dragon Slayer
 Episode 3: Beast from Below
 Episode 4: The Junkyard Crasher
 Episode 5: Hells Hound
 Episode 6: The Destroyer

References

2010s American reality television series
2015 American television series debuts
Discovery Channel original programming
Television shows about weaponry
2015 American television series endings